Mark London Williams is an American author, playwright, journalist, and creator of the Golden Duck-nominated, Los Angeles Times Bestselling young adult time travel series Danger Boy, and author of Max Random and the Zombie 500.

Biography

As a journalist, Williams has written for Variety, Los Angeles Times online, Los Angeles Business Journal, Below the Line and others, and was formerly an executive editor for Digital Coast Reporter.  Currently, he is a columnist for British Cinematographer magazine  , writing a recurring U.S. dispatch, and a contributor to several other sites covering the crafts side of film and TV making. "

Williams has also written short fiction and comic books. He worked as a video game script doctor, and has had several plays produced in Los Angeles, San Francisco, and London. Max Random is in development as a series by Event Horizon productions.

He lives in Los Angeles.

Partial bibliography
Danger Boy series
Ancient Fire
Dragon Sword 
(Tricycle press edition (as Dino Sword)
Trail of Bones
City of Ruins

Comic Book Work
"Zoo" art by John LeCour (Omnibus: Modern Perversity, Blackbird Comics 1991)
"Stockman" credited as "Douglas Williams"  art by Brian Stelfreeze (Fast Forward #2 Family, Piranha Press 1992)
"Bigfoot Vs. Donkey Kong" art by Phil Hester with Marc Erickson and Fredd Gorham (The Big Bigfoot Book, Mojo Press 1996)

Other Works
Curious George Tadpole Trouble Houghton Mifflin, 2007 (credited as adapter of the television episode based on characters created by H.A. and Margret Rey)
"Escape Map" (Our White House: Looking In, Looking Out, Candlewick, 2009)
Magical Mayhem Ambush Books, 2012 Anthology contributor
GhostDance: Showdown at Carthay Circle  Fast Foreword, 2013, Kindle Edition
Max Random and the Zombie 500  Trifecta Publishing, 2018

References

External links

Author bio at Candlewick Press
"Nexus Graphica"

21st-century American novelists
American children's writers
American male novelists
American science fiction writers
American alternate history writers
American male journalists
20th-century American dramatists and playwrights
Living people
1959 births
Jewish American dramatists and playwrights
Berkeley High School (Berkeley, California) alumni
American male dramatists and playwrights
American male short story writers
21st-century American short story writers
20th-century American male writers
21st-century American male writers
20th-century American non-fiction writers
21st-century American non-fiction writers
21st-century American Jews